The 2017–18 Ukrainian Second League was the 27th season since its establishment. The competition commenced on 14 July 2017. The league returned to the multiple group competition format after it was abandoned in 2013. Final composition of the league was approved at the PFL Conference on 21 June 2017. 

The current season competition is in a triple round robin format for each group.

Group A commenced their winter break after the Round 7 postponed match was played on 12 November 2017. Group B will begin their winter break after the completion of Round 22 on 19 November 2017. Group B competitions resumed the spring session on 30 March 2018 and Group A on 31 March 2018.

Teams 
On 21 June 2017, it was announced that 25 teams will play in two divisions, but later FC Balkany Zorya was transferred to the 2017–18 Ukrainian First League and FC Cherkaskyi Dnipro-2 withdrew from the competition, leaving 23 teams in the field.

Promoted teams 
The following six teams were promoted from the 2016–17 Ukrainian Football Amateur League:
 Ahrobiznes Volochysk – group 1 winners, amateur champions (debut)
 Metalist 1925 Kharkiv – group 2 winners (debut)
 Polissya Zhytomyr – 6th place in group 2 (debut; a club with the same name competed in the 2000–01 season)
 Nyva Ternopil – 7th place in group 1 (returning after an absence of four seasons)
 Tavriya Simferopol – 9th place in group 2 (debut)
 FC Lviv – 10th place in group 1 (debut)

Also, one newly created team was admitted:
 SC Dnipro-1 – (debut)

Also, one reserve team was admitted:
 MFC Mykolaiv-2 – (debut)

Relegated teams 
One team was relegated from the 2016–17 Ukrainian Premier League, according to the FIFA sanctions:
 FC Dnipro – 11th place (debut)

The following teams were relegated from the 2016–17 Ukrainian First League.
Bukovyna Chernivtsi – 16th place (returning after one season)
Skala Stryi – 17th place (returning after one season)
FC Ternopil – 18th place (returning after an absence of three seasons)

Renamed teams 
Teplovyk-Prykarpattia Ivano-Frankivsk – prior to the start of the season the club was renamed to FC Prykarpattia Ivano-Frankivsk.

Withdrawn teams 
Illichivets-2 Mariupol – before the start of the season, the club chose to compete in the Under-21 league.
 Cherkaskyi Dnipro-2 – initially, the team passed attestation and was admitted to the PFL, but before the start of the season general director of FC Cherkaskyi Dnipro announced that the club's second team won't take part in professional competitions. The President of the PFL expressed a hope that the league would find a replacement. but no other teams entered the competition.
FC Ternopil – After competing in four matches on 15 August 2017 the club informed the PFL that they are withdrawing from the competition. PFL annulled all their matches.

Location map 
The following map displays the location of teams. Group A teams marked in red. Group B teams marked in green.

Stadiums

Managers

Managerial changes

Group A

League table

Results 
Due to withdrawal of FC Ternopil, after the first full round the season calendar for Group A was redrawn on 7 September.

Position by round

Top goalscorers

Group B

League table

Results

Position by round

Top goalscorers

Championship game
On 1 December 2017, at a session of the PFL council of leagues a decision was made to conduct a Championship game between winners of Group A and Group B. The championship game was played as a single game held on a neutral field. Ahrobiznes won the Second League Group A and qualified for the Championship game on 12 May 2018. On the same day, Dnipro-1 secured the Group B champion title after a win over FC Nikopol.

Ahrobiznes Volochysk are crowned Champions of the Ukrainian Second League for the 2017–18 season

Awards

Round awards

The 2017 annual coaching laureates
The best coaches were identified by the All-Ukrainian Football Coaches Association.

Season awards
The laureates of the 2017–18 season were:
 Best player:  Ihor Khudobyak (Prykarpattia Ivano-Frankivsk)
 Best coach:  Dmytro Mykhaylenko (SC Dnipro-1)
 Top goalscorer:  Serhiy Davydov (Metalist 1925 Kharkiv)
 Fair Play award: Ahrobiznes Volochysk

See also 
 2017–18 Ukrainian Premier League
 2017–18 Ukrainian First League
 2017–18 Ukrainian Cup

References

External links 
 2017–18 Season regulations. Professional Football League of Ukraine and Football Federation of Ukraine

Ukrainian Second League seasons
Second
Ukraine